The 1969–70 Seattle SuperSonics season was the 3rd season of the Seattle SuperSonics in the NBA. After the resignation of Al Bianchi, Lenny Wilkens took the role of player-coach and led the team to a 36–46 record, a six win improvement over their previous season and 3 games behind the Chicago Bulls, who got the last playoff spot in the Western Division. Wilkens led the league in assists with 9.1 apg.

Draft picks

Note: only draft picks who participated in at least one game in the NBA are listed.

Roster

Depth chart

Regular season

Season standings

x – clinched playoff spot

Record vs. opponents

Game log

|- bgcolor=#fcc
| 1
| October 14
| @ New York
| L 101–126
| Bob Rule (27)
|
|
| Madison Square Garden14,796
| 0–1

|- bgcolor=#fcc
| 2
| October 15
| @ Atlanta
| L 119–124
| John Tresvant (29)
|
|
| Alexander Memorial Coliseum3,718
| 0–2

|- bgcolor=#fcc
| 3
| October 18
| @ Chicago
| L 126–131 (OT)
| John Tresvant (28)
|
|
| Chicago Stadium7,430
| 0–3

|- bgcolor=#fcc
| 4
| October 19
| @ Milwaukee
| L 106–130
| Bob Boozer (26)
|
|
| Milwaukee Arena7,370
| 0–4

|- bgcolor=#fcc
| 5
| October 25
| Los Angeles
| L 106–130
| Bob Rule (19)
|
|
| Seattle Center Coliseum12,536
| 0–5

|- bgcolor=#fcc
| 6
| October 28
| Chicago
| L 114–116
| Barry Clemens (14)
|
|
| Seattle Center Coliseum3,620
| 0–6

|- bgcolor=#cfc
| 7
| October 31
| Cincinnati
| W 129–121
| Lenny Wilkens (38)
|
|
| Seattle Center Coliseum4,016
| 1–6

|- bgcolor=#fcc
| 8
| November 2
| @ Atlanta
| L 113–125
| Bob Rule (22)
|
|
| Alexander Memorial Coliseum4,101
| 1–7

|- bgcolor=#cfc
| 9
| November 4
| @ Detroit
| W 116–102
| Bob Boozer (28)
|
|
| Cobo Arena2,076
| 2–7

|- bgcolor=#fcc
| 10
| November 7
| @ Baltimore
| L 112–126
| Bob Rule (29)
|
|
| Baltimore Civic Center4,459
| 2–8

|- bgcolor=#cfc
| 11
| November 8
| @ Philadelphia
| W 125–117
| Bob Rule (32)
|
|
| The Spectrum10,363
| 3–8

|- bgcolor=#fcc
| 12
| November 11
| @ Chicago
| L 100–106
| Lenny Wilkens (19)
|
|
| Chicago Stadium8,149
| 3–9

|- bgcolor=#cfc
| 13
| November 13
| Detroit
| W 117–113
| Bob Rule (28)
|
|
| Seattle Center Coliseum4,106
| 4–9

|- bgcolor=#fcc
| 14
| November 14
| @ San Diego
| L 112–148
| Tom Meschery (26)
|
|
| San Diego Sports Arena4,838
| 4–10

|- bgcolor=#cfc
| 15
| November 15
| Philadelphia
| W 146–136
| Bob Rule (49)
|
|
| Seattle Center Coliseum6,679
| 5–10

|- bgcolor=#fcc
| 16
| November 19
| Atlanta
| L 116–137
| Bob Boozer (24)
|
|
| Seattle Center Coliseum5,583
| 5–11

|- bgcolor=#fcc
| 17
| November 21
| Milwaukee
| L 115–117
| Bob Rule (35)
|
|
| Seattle Center Coliseum12,920
| 5–12

|- bgcolor=#fcc
| 18
| November 23
| Boston
| L 116–125
| Bob Rule (33)
|
|
| Seattle Center Coliseum5,538
| 5–13

|- bgcolor=#fcc
| 19
| November 24
| @ San Diego
| L 105–112
| Lenny Wilkens (23)
|
|
| San Diego Sports Arena3,393
| 5–14

|- bgcolor=#fcc
| 20
| November 25
| San Francisco
| L 106–114
| Bob Rule (24)
|
|
| Seattle Center Coliseum4,001
| 5–15

|- bgcolor=#cfc
| 21
| November 29
| Phoenix
| W 130 129
| Bob Rule (33)
|
|
| Seattle Center Coliseum9,418
| 6–15

|- bgcolor=#fcc
| 22
| November 30
| @ Phoenix
| L 108–116
| John Tresvant (21)
|
|
| Arizona Veterans Memorial Coliseum3,621
| 6–16

|- bgcolor=#fcc
| 23
| December 2
| @ New York
| L 109–129
| Bob Rule (25)
|
|
| Madison Square Garden14,627
| 6–17

|- bgcolor=#cfc
| 24
| December 3
| @ Cincinnati
| W 118–117
| Bob Rule (30)
|
|
| Cincinnati Gardens2,456
| 7–17

|- bgcolor=#fcc
| 25
| December 4
| @ Atlanta
| L 111–119
| Bob Rule (24)
|
|
| Alexander Memorial Coliseum2,931
| 7–18

|- bgcolor=#fcc
| 26
| December 5
| @ Milwaukee
| L 98–131
| Bob Boozer (19)
|
|
| Milwaukee Arena7,064
| 7–19

|- bgcolor=#cfc
| 27
| December 6
| Baltimore
| W 132–129 (OT)
| Bob Rule (40)
|
|
| Philadelphia, PA8,128
| 8–19

|- bgcolor=#cfc
| 28
| December 9
| Detroit
| W 109–104
| Bob Rule (36)
|
|
| Seattle Center Coliseum6,168
| 9–19

|- bgcolor=#cfc
| 29
| December 11
| New York
| W 112–105
| Bob Rule (28)
|
|
| Seattle Center Coliseum10,029
| 10–19

|- bgcolor=#fcc
| 30
| December 12
| Phoenix
| L 116–130
| Tom Meschery (29)
|
|
| Seattle Center Coliseum6,146
| 10–20

|- bgcolor=#fcc
| 31
| December 14
| @ Los Angeles
| L 127–131
| Bob Rule (45)
|
|
| The Forum8,729
| 10–21

|- bgcolor=#fcc
| 32
| December 16
| @ San Francisco
| L 119–125
| Bob Rule (33)
|
|
| Oakland–Alameda County Coliseum Arena3,889
| 10–22

|- bgcolor=#cfc
| 33
| December 17
| Cincinnati
| W 117–104
| Lucius Allen (23)
|
|
| Seattle Center Coliseum4,472
| 11–22

|- bgcolor=#cfc
| 34
| December 19
| Philadelphia
| W 123–116
| Tom Meschery (26)
|
|
| Seattle Center Coliseum6,210
| 12–22

|- bgcolor=#cfc
| 35
| December 21
| San Diego
| W 112–96
| Lucius Allen, Tom Meschery (18)
|
|
| Seattle Center Coliseum6,021
| 13–22

|- bgcolor=#fcc
| 36
| December 23
| @ San Francisco
| L 115–119
| Lucius Allen (19)
|
|
| Oakland–Alameda County Coliseum Arena3,481
| 13–23

|- bgcolor=#fcc
| 37
| December 26
| Boston
| L 112–122
| Bob Rule (41)
|
|
| Seattle Center Coliseum10,273
| 13–24

|- bgcolor=#fcc
| 38
| December 27
| New York
| L 117–119
| Bob Rule (25)
|
|
| Vancouver, BC4,206
| 13–25

|- bgcolor=#cfc
| 39
| December 30
| Phoenix
| W 134–121
| Tom Meschery (24)
|
|
| Seattle Center Coliseum5,201
| 14–25

|- bgcolor=#fcc
| 40
| January 1
| Chicago
| L 111–114
| Bob Rule (36)
|
|
| Seattle Center Coliseum5,149
| 14–26

|- bgcolor=#fcc
| 41
| January 3
| Los Angeles
| L 109–126
| Bob Rule (26)
|
|
| Seattle Center Coliseum8,677
| 14–27

|- bgcolor=#fcc
| 42
| January 4
| Detroit
| L 110–116
| Dick Snyder (27)
|
|
| Portland, OR3,451
| 14–28

|- bgcolor=#fcc
| 43
| January 6
| @ Atlanta
| L 97–101
| Bob Boozer (21)
|
|
| Alexander Memorial Coliseum3,839
| 14–29

|- bgcolor=#cfc
| 44
| January 9
| @ Philadelphia
| W 135–132
| Lenny Wilkens (31)
|
|
| The Spectrum4,220
| 15–29

|- bgcolor=#fcc
| 45
| January 10
| @ Detroit
| L 128–129
| Tom Meschery (28)
|
|
| Cobo Arena2,346
| 15–30

|- bgcolor=#fcc
| 46
| January 13
| Boston
| L 102–111
| Lucius Allen (23)
|
|
| Philadelphia, PA5,678
| 15–31

|- bgcolor=#cfc
| 47
| January 14
| Philadelphia
| W 122–110
| Dick Snyder (26)
|
|
| Boston, MA4,614
| 16–31

|- bgcolor=#cfc
| 48
| January 16
| Chicago
| W 119–103
| Lenny Wilkens (23)
|
|
| Kansas City, KS3,713
| 17–31

|- bgcolor=#cfc
| 49
| January 17
| @ Phoenix
| W 134–131
| Lenny Wilkens (24)
|
|
| Arizona Veterans Memorial Coliseum9,094
| 18–31

|- bgcolor=#fcc
| 50
| January 22
| Phoenix
| L 120–129
| Bob Rule (31)
|
|
| Las Cruces, NM2,805
| 18–32

|- bgcolor=#fcc
| 51
| January 23
| @ Los Angeles
| L 100–128
| Bob Rule (22)
|
|
| The Forum11,393
| 18–33

|- bgcolor=#fcc
| 52
| January 24
| Los Angeles
| L 121–122 (OT)
| Bob Rule (22)
|
|
| Seattle Center Coliseum9,697
| 18–34

|- bgcolor=#cfc
| 53
| January 28
| Atlanta
| W 120–119
| Dick Snyder (23)
|
|
| Seattle Center Coliseum4,483
| 19–34

|- bgcolor=#cfc
| 54
| January 29
| San Francisco
| W 105–101
| Dick Snyder (24)
|
|
| Seattle Center Coliseum4,010
| 20–34

|- bgcolor=#fcc
| 55
| January 30
| @ San Diego
| L 117–119 (OT)
| Bob Boozer (33)
|
|
| San Diego Sports Arena4,941
| 20–35

|- bgcolor=#cfc
| 56
| February 1
| Milwaukee
| W 118 116
| Tom Meschery (27)
|
|
| Seattle Center Coliseum12,660
| 21–35

|- bgcolor=#cfc
| 57
| February 3
| @ Baltimore
| W 120–115
| Bob Rule (29)
|
|
| Baltimore Civic Center4,418
| 22 35

|- bgcolor=#cfc
| 58
| February 4
| @ Cincinnati
| W 121–115
| Bob Rule (30)
|
|
| Cincinnati Gardens2,805
| 23 35

|- bgcolor=#fcc
| 59
| February 6
| @ Boston
| L 117–127
| Lenny Wilkens (29)
|
|
| Boston Garden6,109
| 23–36

|- bgcolor=#fcc
| 60
| February 7
| @ Detroit
| L 109–113
| Tom Meschery (21)
|
|
| Cobo Arena3,540
| 23–37

|- bgcolor=#cfc
| 61
| February 8
| Philadelphia
| W 118–117
| Bob Rule (29)
|
|
| Seattle Center Coliseum8,050
| 24–37

|- bgcolor=#cfc
| 62
| February 11
| Baltimore
| W 119–117
| Bob Boozer (23)
|
|
| Seattle Center Coliseum5,810
| 25–37

|- bgcolor=#cfc
| 63
| February 13
| Baltimore
| W 141–138
| Bob Rule (39)
|
|
| Seattle Center Coliseum8,905
| 26–37

|- bgcolor=#fcc
| 64
| February 17
| Phoenix
| L 118–129
| Bob Rule (25)
|
|
| Seattle Center Coliseum8,220
| 26–38

|- bgcolor=#fcc
| 65
| February 18
| San Diego
| L 119–122
| Bob Rule (42)
|
|
| Eugene, OR5,500
| 26–39

|- bgcolor=#fcc
| 66
| February 20
| Boston
| L 125–127
| Bob Rule (27)
|
|
| Seattle Center Coliseum8,614
| 26–40

|- bgcolor=#fcc
| 67
| February 21
| Milwaukee
| L 127–140
| Bob Rule (33)
|
|
| Portland, OR11,139
| 26–41

|- bgcolor=#cfc
| 68
| February 22
| San Francisco
| W 131–127
| Bob Rule (30)
|
|
| Seattle Center Coliseum11,564
| 27–41

|- bgcolor=#cfc
| 69
| February 24
| San Francisco
| W 130–122
| Bob Rule (29)
|
|
| Seattle Center Coliseum4,802
| 28–41

|- bgcolor=#cfc
| 70
| February 25
| Atlanta
| W 120–112
| Bob Rule (27)
|
|
| Seattle Center Coliseum5,685
| 29–41

|- bgcolor=#cfc
| 71
| February 27
| @ San Francisco
| W 107–99
| Lenny Wilkens (22)
|
|
| Oakland, CA4,604
| 30–41

|- bgcolor=#cfc
| 72
| February 28
| Chicago
| W 140–104
| Bob Rule (32)
|
|
| Seattle Center Coliseum13,096
| 31–41

|- bgcolor=#cfc
| 73
| March 3
| San Diego
| W 126–114
| Dick Snyder (26)
|
|
| Seattle Center Coliseum9,915
| 32–41

|- bgcolor=#cfc
| 74
| March 6
| Cincinnati
| W 126–122
| Dick Snyder (33)
|
|
| Seattle Center Coliseum13,102
| 33–41

|- bgcolor=#fcc
| 75
| March 8
| Baltimore
| L 106–109
| Bob Rule (28)
|
|
| Seattle Center Coliseum13,058
| 33–42

|- bgcolor=#fcc
| 76
| March 9
| @ Milwaukee
| L 105–124
| Bob Rule (19)
|
|
| Milwaukee Arena10,746
| 33–43

|- bgcolor=#fcc
| 77
| March 10
| @ New York
| L 99–117
| Bob Rule (24)
|
|
| Madison Square Garden18,212
| 33–44

|- bgcolor=#cfc
| 78
| March 13
| New York
| W 115–103
| Lenny Wilkens (28)
|
|
| Portland, OR11,035
| 34–44

|- bgcolor=#fcc
| 79
| March 15
| @ Cincinnati
| L 113–116
| Bob Rule (25)
|
|
| Cincinnati Gardens9,640
| 34–45

|- bgcolor=#cfc
| 80
| March 17
| @ Chicago
| W 109–102
| Three players (22)
|
|
| Chicago Stadium9,098
| 35–45

|- bgcolor=#cfc
| 81
| March 20
| @ Boston
| W 123–119
| Dick Snyder (20)
|
|
| Boston Garden10,393
| 36–45

|- bgcolor=#fcc
| 82
| March 22
| @ Los Angeles
| L 118–121
| Bob Rule (33)
|
|
| The Forum13,745
| 36–46

Player statistics

  Statistics with the Seattle SuperSonics.

Awards
 Bob Rule and Lenny Wilkens made their first and seventh All-Star appearances respectively at the 1970 NBA All-Star Game.

Transactions

Overview

  Kron was put on waivers, and after no other team claimed him the Sonics sold him to the Kentucky Colonels of the American Basketball Association.

Trades

References

Seattle SuperSonics seasons
Seattle